Rumunki-Chwały  is a village in the administrative district of Gmina Rościszewo, within Sierpc County, Masovian Voivodeship, in east-central Poland.

References

Villages in Sierpc County